Jacob Kasdan (born October 28, 1974) is an American filmmaker and actor. He is best known for directing Walk Hard (2007), Bad Teacher (2011), Sex Tape (2014), Jumanji: Welcome to the Jungle (2017) and Jumanji: The Next Level (2019).

Early life
Kasdan was born and raised in a Jewish family, with little religious education in Detroit, Michigan, the son of Meg (née Goldman), a writer, and writer-director Lawrence Kasdan. His younger brother, Jon Kasdan, also works in the film and television industry as an actor and writer.

Career
Kasdan has directed seven theatrical films: Zero Effect (1998), Orange County (2002), The TV Set (2006), Walk Hard: The Dewey Cox Story (2007), Bad Teacher (2011), Sex Tape (2014), Jumanji: Welcome to the Jungle (2017) and Jumanji: The Next Level (2019). He has also worked in television, most notably with Judd Apatow, as a consulting producer and director on Freaks and Geeks and as a director on Undeclared. He has also directed numerous stage productions. He is attached to direct John Grisham novel Calico Joe to a family film adaptation.

In 2008, Kasdan received his first Golden Globe nomination for Walk Hard in the Best Original Song category (shared with John C. Reilly, Judd Apatow, and Marshall Crenshaw), but lost to "Guaranteed" from Into the Wild (written by Eddie Vedder).

As a child, he made several appearances in his father's movies such as The Big Chill and Silverado (in the former he is an autograph seeker at a funeral and in the latter a stable boy).

After the success of New Girl, Kasdan announced that on July 11, 2012, that he had signed a deal with 20th Century Fox Television, through The Detective Agency, to pursue own projects.

In February 2015, Fox announced it had greenlit a pilot for the comedy The Grinder to be directed by Kasdan and starring Rob Lowe.

On March 26, 2019, The Detective Agency's producing partners Jake Kasdan and Melvin Mar reupped, and signed a new overall deal at 20th Century Fox Television.

In October 2021, it was announced that Disney+ had given a series order to a television adaptation of graphic novel, American Born Chinese. It will be produced by 20th Century Television with Kelvin Yu and Charles Yu as writers and executive producers, Marvin Mar and Kasdan as executive producers, and Destin Daniel Cretton as director and executive producer. Most recently, he served as executive producer of the workplace comedy pilot XYZ at ABC.

Personal life
Kasdan is married to singer-songwriter Inara George of The Bird and the Bee. They have three children, including twins.

Filmography

Films 

Acting credits

Soundtrack credits

Other credits

Television and web 

Acting credits

Music video 

 Believe by Shawn Mendes (2015)

Awards

References

External links 
 
 The Director Interviews: Jake Kasdan, The TV Set  at Filmmaker Magazine
 The Director Interviews: Jake Kasdan, Walk Hard: The Dewey Cox Story at Filmmaker Magazine

1974 births
American male child actors
American male film actors
Comedy film directors
Fantasy film directors
Action film directors
Jewish American male actors
Jewish American film directors
Jewish American film producers
Jewish American screenwriters
American television directors
Living people
Male actors from Detroit
Film directors from Michigan
21st-century American Jews